"Meanwhile" is the twenty-sixth and final episode in the seventh season of the American animated television series Futurama, the 140th episode of the series overall, and the finale of the second run. The episode was written by Ken Keeler and directed by Peter Avanzino. It premiered on Comedy Central in the United States on September 4, 2013, along with Futurama Live, a special preshow and aftershow for the occasion. 

Set in a retro-futuristic 31st century, the series follows the adventures of the employees of Planet Express, an interplanetary delivery company. As the conclusion to the series, the episode revolves around the romantic relationship between Fry and Leela. The plot involves Professor Farnsworth inventing a device that allows the user to travel backwards in time by ten seconds. However, it is stolen and abused by Fry, who wants to use it to prolong the sunset during a romantic dinner after his marriage proposal to Leela.

Due to the recurrently uncertain production status of Futurama, "Meanwhile" is the fourth episode written to serve as an ending to the series. It follows "The Devil's Hands Are Idle Playthings", "Into the Wild Green Yonder", and "Overclockwise", all of which were also written by Ken Keeler. "Meanwhile" was watched by 2.21 million people in its original broadcast, making it the 5th most watched episode ever to originally air on Comedy Central, and it received acclaim from television critics. 

Despite it being the series finale, the series was announced in 2022 that it will return on Hulu for new episodes in 2023.

Plot
After Leela is ejected into space and nearly killed due to a ride malfunction during a package delivery run to Luna Park, Fry becomes worried that he may lose her again and decides to propose to her. Back at the Planet Express building, the Professor announces two new inventions: a time button that causes the entire universe to jump backward 10 seconds in time, and a shelter that shields people from the button's effects. Fry takes the button and uses it to repeatedly steal candidate diamonds for an engagement ring with Bender's help. After presenting the ring to Leela, he invites her to meet him atop the Vampire State Building at 6:30 pm if she agrees to marry him. If she does not arrive, he will infer rejection. He repeatedly uses the button to prolong the sunset, but she has not arrived by the time his watch reads 7:02. Heartbroken, he jumps off the roof in a suicide attempt, but sees her approaching and notes that the building's clock reads 6:25; his watch has continued to run normally throughout all his uses of the button. He tries to undo the jump, but is unable to return to the rooftop because the device takes 10 seconds to recharge between uses and he has been falling for longer than that time. As a result, he continually loops falling toward the ground from several feet below the roof, never able to reach safety.

The Professor notices the device has been stolen and is repeatedly looping time, and worries the universe could be damaged. He also warns that anyone leaving the shelter could be destroyed if the device is subsequently reused less than ten seconds later, because the anti-chronitons would not know where to send that person back. Bender betrays Fry's theft of the device, and, using the shelter, the crew approach the Vampire State Building to save him. By this time, Fry is tired after falling for so long and accidentally lets go of the button. He is instantly killed when he hits the ground, but Leela picks up the button from Fry's splattered remains and uses it to loop the final seconds of Fry's life. The Professor, being outside the time shelter, tries to stop her and is seemingly vaporized when Leela presses the button. After several loops, Bender engineers a method of saving Fry's life using an airbag he contains. Fry survives this time, but lands on the button, smashing it and freezing time throughout the universe for everyone and everything except himself and Leela.

With the world theirs alone, Fry and Leela conduct their wedding themselves and spend what is, for them, decades romantically wandering the stationary world. A mysterious glimmer bothers them from time to time, but otherwise, they are very happy. In old age, they go to the top of the Vampire State Building to drink the champagne Fry had laid out there before the button was destroyed. The glimmer finally reveals itself to be the Professor, who was shifted into a different time frame instead of being killed. He has been trying to find the button for decades and, since Fry has kept the pieces, is able to rebuild it with one key modification – the next press will restore the entire universe to the instant before the Professor conceived of the device and erase everyone's memory of all events since then. Despite having enjoyed growing old together, Fry and Leela both agree to relive their lives and the Professor presses the button.

Reception
The original American broadcast of "Meanwhile" on September 4, 2013 was watched by 2.21 million households, making it the 5th most watched episode ever to originally air on Comedy Central.
"Meanwhile" has received critical acclaim. Max Nicholson, for IGN, wrote that "Meanwhile" was "a fitting end to a classic animated series". He gave the episode a 9 out of 10.

Zack Handlen, writing for The A.V. Club, said that, "the first five minutes are passable but rushed, and the hook of Fry deciding he needed to ask Leela to marry him isn't all that exciting". However, he later went on to say that "this finale settles somewhere between the 'too happy' and the 'oh dear God when will it end', which makes it just about perfect. It has just about everything you could want from Futurama: there's a nifty time-travel plot, Fry and Leela get married, Bender is a jackass, Zoidberg loses $10, and Fry dies". He graded the episode an A.

Sean Gardert, writing for Paste, was relatively more critical and summarized that, "Not to say that 'Meanwhile' was a bad episode, as it was truly great, an epic 22 minutes that stood up to anything the show's done before. But after toeing up to that line of doing something truly impressive and revolutionary for the show, they backed away again. I was disappointed, to say the least, but I still look forward to catching this episode as a rerun, and have already written fanfiction in my head as to what would happen were Fry and Leela allowed to return to the past with all of their memories still intact."

Indiewire listed "Meanwhile" among their list of the best TV series finales.

References

External links
 
 

2013 American television episodes
Futurama (season 7) episodes
Television episodes about time travel
Older versions of cartoon characters
Television episodes about weddings
Television episodes written by Ken Keeler
Television episodes about suicide